Trevitt is a surname. Notable people with the surname include:

Gavin Trevitt
Simon Trevitt (born 1967), English footballer
William Trevitt (1809–1881), American doctor, politician, diplomat, and newspaper publisher
William Trevitt (dancer), British dancer and choreographer
Harry Smith Trevitt (1878–1979), organist and composer
Ryan Trevitt (born 2003), English footballer